Matthew Kipling Fong (November 20, 1953 – June 1, 2011) was an American Republican politician who served as the 30th California State Treasurer. He was a government appointee, finance industry director, and consultant after retiring from the Air Force Reserve. As of 2023, he is the most recent Republican to serve as California State Treasurer.

Life and education
Fong was born in Alameda, California. He was the adopted son of March Fong Eu, a Democrat who served as the 25th California Secretary of State. He graduated from Skyline High School, and went on to earn a Bachelor of Science degree at the United States Air Force Academy in 1975. 

In 1982, he received an MBA at Pepperdine University, and in 1985 attained his J.D. degree at the Southwestern University School of Law in Los Angeles.

Public career 
Fong retired from his Air Force Reserve assignment at The Pentagon, serving as an adviser to the U.S. Secretary of the Air Force on budget and finance with the rank of lieutenant colonel in the Air Force Reserve.

California politics 
In 1990, Fong unsuccessfully ran for California State Controller, where he lost to Democrat Gray Davis. In 1991, Fong was appointed to the State Board of Equalization by Governor Governor Pete Wilson. Fong would serve as Vice Chairman of the board from 1991 to 1994. 

In 1994, Fong ran to succeed Kathleen Brown as State Treasurer. Fong defeated Democrat Phil Angelides to secure a four-year term beginning in January 1995.

In the 1998 U.S. Senate election, he unsuccessfully challenged incumbent California Senator Barbara Boxer. Fong earned endorsements from national Republican leaders, including Senate Majority Leader Trent Lott and House Speaker Newt Gingrich.

Private sector career 
He was president of the Strategic Advisory Group, providing counsel to CEOs and senior executives on strategy and business development. He was also Special Counsel to the law firm of Sheppard, Mullin, Richter & Hampton. Fong held Series 7 and 63 securities licenses and was a principal of Belstar Group, a New York-based asset manager.

Fong was an independent director of TCW Group's complex of mutual funds.  He also served on two technology start-up companies' boards of directors—one dealing with earthquake detection devices (Seismic Warning Systems) and the other involved with energy-saving devices (American Grid).

U.S. President George W. Bush appointed Fong chairman of the Pension Benefit Guaranty Corporation Advisory Board. Fong also served as a Regent of Pepperdine University and a Trustee of Southwestern University School of Law.

Personal life 
Fong lived in Pasadena, California with his wife, Paula, with whom he had two children: Matthew II and Jade. Fong died of cancer in his Pasadena home on June 1, 2011. He was buried at the United States Air Force Academy Cemetery in Colorado Springs, Colorado. He was survived by his late mother and his wife and children.

References

Further reading 
 Fong, Matt. "California Crisis a Golden Opportunity for Voters." Sacramento Bee, March 22, 1992.
 Fong, Matt. "Unfair Taxes Are Hurting State Revenue by Killing Jobs," Sacramento Bee, October 4, 1992.
 Lin, Sam Chu. "Matt Fong Scopes Asian Pacific American Economic Opportunities." Asian Week, February 4, 1994.

External links 
Matthew Fong's profile at Sheppard Mullin

1953 births
2011 deaths
California politicians of Chinese descent
California Republicans
Deaths from cancer in California
Deaths from skin cancer
Pension Benefit Guaranty Corporation
People from Alameda, California
People from Pasadena, California
People from Greater Los Angeles
Pepperdine University alumni
Southwestern Law School alumni
State treasurers of California
United States Air Force Academy alumni
Politicians from Oakland, California
United States Air Force colonels
Military personnel from California
Asian conservatism in the United States